Derrynaflan Church is a Medieval church and National Monument located in County Tipperary, Ireland.

Location

History
The monastery at Derrynaflan ("Oak grove of the Flanns"; formerly Daire Eidnech, "ivied oak grove") was founded by Ruadhán of Lorrha in the 6th century AD. It came under the patronage of the King-Bishops of Cashel. It was an important culdee centre, but went into decline after Fedelmid mac Crimthainn died in AD 846. Only the enclosure survives.

The surviving stone church is a pre-Norman cell with a chancel later added.

A Franciscan community existed at Derrynaflan between 1676 and 1717.

It is famous as the discovery site of the Derrynaflan Hoard of gold and silver objects of the 8th–9th century.

A stone slab found on the site (now in the National Museum of Ireland – Archaeology) is inscribed OR DOAN MAIN DVBSCVLL, "a prayer for the soul of Dubscuile."

Description

A pre-Norman single-celled church without antae. The east, north and south walls of the chancel with five windows and the foundations of the nave survive. 

There is also a ring barrow and medieval cemetery. To the northeast is a burial site, supposedly that of the legendary Gobán Saor.

References

National Monuments in County Tipperary
Archaeological sites in County Tipperary
Franciscan monasteries in the Republic of Ireland